The third Zaia government, led by president Luca Zaia, has been the government of Veneto since 16 October 2020.

Governments of Veneto
2020 establishments in Italy
Current governments
Cabinets established in 2020